Rooms Katholieke Amateur Voetbalvereniging (Dutch: Roman Catholic Amateur Football Club), abbreviated as RKAV Volendam, is a Dutch football team. It competes in the 2017–18 Eerste Klasse. It relegated from the Hoofdklasse in 2015.

History
RKAV was founded in 1920 Volendam as Victoria. It soon changed its name to RKSV Volendam (with an S for Sports Club). Initially, the club participated in the Catholic football league.  It joined the KNVB in 1940. In July 1977 the club split into the professional FC Volendam and the Hoofdklasse amateur-team RKAV Volendam.

RKAV relegated from the Hoofdklasse after the 2014–2015 season. Preparing for the 2017-18 Eerste Klasse season, RKAV beat Hoofdklasse-side Amsterdamsche FC, 2-1.

References

External links
 Official site

Football clubs in the Netherlands
Association football clubs established in 1997
1997 establishments in the Netherlands
Football clubs in Edam-Volendam
Volendam